Andrea Mitchell "Mitch" D'Arrigo (born 28 April 1995), is a freestyle swimmer who has competed internationally for Italy and for the United States. He specializes in the men's 400 metre freestyle event, where he won two silver medals and one bronze medal representing Italy at the European Championships. He also earned silver and bronze medals for Italy in the men's 4×200 metre freestyle relay events at the World and European Championships.

D'Arrigo competed for Italy at the 2016 Summer Olympics in the men's 200 metre freestyle and men's 4×200 metre freestyle relay.

He also competed for the United States at the 2017 World University Games, winning a silver medal in the men's 4×200 m freestyle relay.

D'Arrigo was born in Rome, Italy, and moved to Gainesville, Florida, where he attended P. K. Yonge Developmental Research School as a high school senior. He joined the University of Florida team in 2013. D'Arrigo has dual citizenship; his father is Italian and his mother is American.

References

External links
 
 
 
 
 
 

1995 births
Living people
American male freestyle swimmers
Italian male freestyle swimmers
American people of Italian descent
Italian people of American descent
Olympic swimmers of Italy
Swimmers at the 2016 Summer Olympics
Universiade silver medalists for the United States
Universiade medalists in swimming
Medalists at the 2017 Summer Universiade
Florida Gators men's swimmers